Yeshivat Hesder Petah Tikva is a Hesder Yeshiva located in Petah Tikva, Israel. Established in 1998, it currently has approximately 200 students, of whom 25% are actively serving in the IDF.

History
Yeshivat Hesder Petah Tikva was established by Rabbi Yuval Cherlow, Rabbi David Stav, and Rabbi Shai Piron, founders of the Tzohar Foundation, a moderate Orthodox organization that promotes ties between religious and secular Jews in Israel. The yeshiva, which embraces a modern Orthodox educational philosophy, combines Torah study with military service. The yeshiva also serves as an institute for teacher training under the auspices of the College for Religious Studies in Rehovot, and operates a religious high school.

Petah Tikva is known for its demanding curriculum, and its study hall can be found fully occupied into the latest hours of the night. For this reason, Petah Tikva has instituted rigorous entrance exams in order to ensure that its prospective students can meet its demanding 5-year program. Historically, it has reserved a handful of spots for overseas students, who may be admitted to participate in its program for 1–2 years, with the option of joining their classmates in both IDF service and full program completion.

Its students have served in some of the Israel Defense Forces' most elite units, ranging from intelligence to combat.

References

External links
Yeshivat Petah Tikva's Official Website

Educational institutions established in 1998
Petah Tikva
Buildings and structures in Petah Tikva
1998 establishments in Israel